The Guye is a  long river in the Saône-et-Loire département, central eastern France. It flows primarily south, before turning east-northeast near Salornay-sur-Guye and flowing into the Grosne. It is a left tributary of the Grosne into which it flows between Malay and Savigny-sur-Grosne.

Communes along its course
The following communes, ordered from source to mouth, lie along the Guye:
 Sainte-Hélène
 Moroges
 Bissey-sous-Cruchaud
 Sassangy
 Cersot
 Savianges
 Germagny
 Saint-Martin-du-Tartre
 Genouilly
 Joncy
 Burzy
 Saint-Martin-la-Patrouille
 Saint-Huruge
 Sailly
 Sigy-le-Châtel
 Salornay-sur-Guye
 Cortevaix
 Bonnay
 Malay
 Savigny-sur-Grosne

References

Rivers of France
Rivers of Saône-et-Loire
Rivers of Bourgogne-Franche-Comté